Charles H. Reynolds (October 10, 1924 – January 27, 1996) was a justice of the Kentucky Supreme Court from 1991 to 1996.

Life and education 
He was born October 10, 1924 in Warren County, Kentucky, the son of Charles H. Reynolds (Senior) and Hilda Stout Reynolds.   He obtained a bachelors degree from Western Kentucky University and then his law degree from the University of Louisville.

In World War II he served with the Army Air Force and was decorated with three Bronze Stars for heroism in combat.

He was a Catholic and active in his faith, his death was recognised by the local Bishop.

Career 
He started practising law in 1950, going on to serve Bowling Green and Warren Count as city judge, county attorney, chairman of the planning and zoning commission and commissioner of the Bowling Green district court.

He was an appellate judge for 15 years and one of the original judges at the creation of the Kentucky Court of Appeals when it was created in 1976.

On November 6, 1990 Reynolds narrowly won the election against Willian S. Cooper to obtain the seat on the supreme court for the 2nd district, a seat that had been vacated as the presiding justice William Gant has retired due to health.

He was named "Kentucky Judge of the Year" in 1994.

One of his key decisions was in the "Steel Vest" case that made  it difficult to dismiss Kentucky civil cases prior to trial. He was also recognised for opinions in rulings that crime victims have no standing in shock probation decisions, federal pensioners should get a tax refund on state income, and for upholding the disorderly conduct conviction of a woman who yelled obscenities at a military parade float.

In tribute to his career as a judge and for the many attorneys he trained, he was described as ethical, courteous, humble, honourable and of winning arguments by "nicing them to death".

He posthumously received the William H. Natcher Award for distinguished service to government, for his dedication to people, integrity and fair dealings.

Death 
Reynolds died unexpectedly January 27, 1996 aged 71 at the medical center in Bowling Green, Kentucky. He was survived by Mary his wife, seven sons, four daughters and 22 grandchildren.

References

1924 births
1996 deaths
Judges of the Kentucky Court of Appeals
Justices of the Kentucky Supreme Court
Western Kentucky University alumni
University of Louisville alumni
United States Army Air Forces personnel of World War II
20th-century American judges